Neoliomera is a genus of crabs in the family Xanthidae, containing the following species:

Neoliomera cerasinus Ng, 2002
Neoliomera demani Forest & Guinot, 1961
Neoliomera insularis (Adams & White, 1849)
Neoliomera intermedia Odhner, 1925
Neoliomera lippa (Nobili, 1905)
Neoliomera nobilii Odhner, 1925
Neoliomera ovata Tweedie, 1950
Neoliomera praetexta (Rathbun, 1906)
Neoliomera pubescens (H. Milne Edwards, 1834)
Neoliomera richteroides Sakai, 1969
Neoliomera richtersi (De Man, 1889)
Neoliomera sabaea (Nobili, 1905)
Neoliomera striata Buitendijk, 1941
Neoliomera sundaica (De Man, 1888)
Neoliomera themisto (De Man, 1889)
Neoliomera variolosa (A. Milne-Edwards, 1873)

References

Xanthoidea